Trapper Creek is a census-designated place (CDP) in Matanuska-Susitna Borough, Alaska, United States. It is part of the Anchorage Metropolitan Area and is known as the southern gateway to Denali State Park. According to the 2020 census the population of Trapper Creek was 499.

Geography
It is at mile 114.5 on the Parks Highway, just south of Denali State Park. The Trapper Creek CDP extends west down the Petersville Road, which leads to mining, prospecting, and recreation country in the foothills of the Alaska Range.

The eastern border of the CDP is formed by the Chulitna and Susitna rivers.

Demographics

Trapper Creek first appeared on the 1990 U.S. Census as a census-designated place (CDP).

As of the census of 2000, there were 423 people, 182 households, and 123 families residing in the CDP.  The population density was 1.2 people per square mile (0.4/km2).  There were 361 housing units at an average density of 1.0 per square mile (0.4/km2).  The racial makeup of the CDP was 87.71% White, 0.24% Black or African American, 8.27% Native American, 0.47% Asian, and 3.31% from two or more races.  1.18% of the population were Hispanic or Latino of any race.

There were 182 households, out of which 24.7% had children under the age of 18 living with them, 52.2% were married couples living together, 8.2% had a female householder with no husband present, and 31.9% were non-families. 28.0% of all households were made up of individuals, and 5.5% had someone living alone who was 65 years of age or older.  The average household size was 2.32 and the average family size was 2.74.

In the CDP, the population was spread out, with 22.7% under the age of 18, 5.2% from 18 to 24, 23.6% from 25 to 44, 39.0% from 45 to 64, and 9.5% who were 65 years of age or older.  The median age was 44 years. For every 100 females, there were 121.5 males.  For every 100 females age 18 and over, there were 125.5 males.

The median income for a household in the CDP was $27,031, and the median income for a family was $34,250. Males had a median income of $65,446 versus $11,250 for females. The per capita income for the CDP was $18,247.  About 27.6% of families and 24.7% of the population were below the poverty line, including 16.7% of those under age 18 and 22.6% of those age 65 or over.

References

External links
 trappercreek.org

Census-designated places in Alaska
Census-designated places in Matanuska-Susitna Borough, Alaska
Anchorage metropolitan area